Joseph Thomas Guastella Jr. (born 1965) is a retired lieutenant general in the United States Air Force who served as the Deputy Chief of Staff for Operations of the United States Air Force. He was commissioned upon his graduation from the United States Air Force Academy in 1987.

Air Force career
Joseph Thomas Guastella Jr. entered the United States Air Force in 1987 as a graduate of the United States Air Force Academy. He is a command pilot with more than 4,000 flight hours in the F-16 Fighting Falcon and A-10 Thunderbolt II. He has served multiple combat tours and flown combat missions in support of Operations Just Cause and Desert Storm. He further instructed at the United States Air Force Fighter Weapons School. Guastella has commanded the 555th Fighter Squadron, "Triple Nickel", Aviano Air Base, Italy, the 20th Fighter Wing at Shaw Air Force Base, South Carolina, and the 455th Air Expeditionary Wing, Bagram Airfield, Afghanistan.

As a general officer, Guastella served at the Pentagon as the deputy director of Programs, Office of the Deputy Chief of Staff for Strategic Plans and Programs. Following his reassignment, he was selected as commander of the 455th Air Expeditionary Wing. He served as the deputy director of Requirements, Joint Staff and was subsequently assigned as Deputy Chief of Staff, Operations and Intelligence, NATO. Most recently he served as the Director of Integrated Air, Space, Cyberspace and Intelligence, Surveillance and Reconnaissance Operations at Headquarters Air Force Space Command, Peterson AFB, Colorado.

Guastella is a graduate of the Air Command and Staff College, National War College and the Senior Executive Fellows program.

In May 2022, the Air Force announced Guastella's retirement from active duty.

Education
1987 Bachelor of Science in Astronautical Engineering, U.S. Air Force Academy, Colorado Springs, Colo. 
1994 Squadron Officer School, Maxwell AFB, Ala.
1997 Master of Science in Aero Science Technology, Embry Riddle University, Daytona Beach, Fla. 
2001 Air Command and Staff College, Maxwell AFB, Ala. 
2006 Master of Science in National Security Strategy, National War College, Fort McNair, Washington, D.C. 
2011 Senior Executive Fellows program, John F. Kennedy School of Government, Harvard University, Cambridge, Mass.

Assignments
August 1987 – January 1989, student pilot, 80th Flying Training Wing, Sheppard AFB, Texas 
January 1989 – September 1989, F-16 initial training, Luke AFB, Ariz. 
September 1989 – May 1992, squadron electronic combat pilot and assistant weapons officer, 526th Tactical Fighter Squadron, Ramstein AB, Germany 
May 1992 – May 1993, instructor pilot, assistant flight commander and assistant weapons officer, 35th Fighter Squadron, Kunsan AB, South Korea 
May 1993 – April 1994, standardization and evaluation flight examiner, 526th TFS, Ramstein AB, Germany 
April 1994 – January 1995, standardization and evaluation flight examiner, 555th FS, Aviano AB, Italy 
Jan 1995 – June 1995, student, fighter Weapons School, Nellis AFB, Nev. 
June 1995 – December 1996, squadron weapons and tactics officer and assistant wing weapons officer, 555th FS, Aviano AB, Italy 
December 1996 – August 2000, Instructor, F-16 Fighter Weapons Instructor Course, Nellis AFB, Nev. 
September 2000 – June 2001, student, Air Command and Staff College, Maxwell AFB, Ala. 
June 2001 – August 2002, action officer, Joint Strike Fighter and Combat Identification Programs, Headquarters Air Force, Directorate of Operational Requirements, Washington, D.C. 
August 2002 – October 2003, operations officer, 555th FS, Aviano AB, Italy 
October 2003 – July 2005, commander, 555th Fighter Squadron, Aviano AB, Italy 
August 2005 – July 2006, student, National War College, Fort Lesley J. McNair, Washington, D.C. 
June 2006 – June 2007, U.S. CENTAF, (A3) forward and CAOC Director of Operations, Southwest Asia 
June 2007 – August 2008, Deputy Director CAPSTONE, National Defense University, Fort Lesley J. McNair, Washington, D.C. 
August 2008 – October 2008, vice commander, 20th Fighter Wing, Shaw AFB, S.C. 
October 2008 – June 2010, commander, 20th Fighter Wing, Shaw AFB, S.C. 
June 2010 – July 2011, Chief Program Integration Division, Directorate of Programs, DCS Strategic Plans and Programs, the Pentagon Washington, D.C. 
July 2011 – June 2012, deputy director of Programs, Office of the Deputy Chief of Staff for Strategic Plans and Programs, Headquarters U.S. Air Force, Washington, D.C. 
July 2012 – July 2013, commander, 455th Air Expeditionary Wing, Bagram Airfield, Afghanistan 
July 2013 – July 2015, deputy director of Requirements (J8), Joint Staff, Washington, D.C. 
July 2015 – July 2017, Deputy Chief of Staff, Operations and Intelligence, SHAPE, Casteau Belgium 
July 2017 – August 2018, Director of Integrated Air, Space, Cyberspace and Intelligence, Surveillance and Reconnaissance Operations, Headquarters Air Force Space Command, Peterson AFB, Colo. 
August 2018 – July 2020, Commander, U.S. Air Forces Central Command, Combined Forces Air Component Commander, U.S. Central Command, Southwest Asia
August 2020 – July 2022, Deputy Chief of Staff, Operations, Headquarters Air Force, the Pentagon, Arlington, Va.

Flight information
Rating: command pilot 
Flight hours: more than 4,000, including more than 1,000 combat 
Aircraft flown: F-16C/D, A-10C

Awards and decorations

Effective dates of promotions

References

 
 

 

1965 births
Embry–Riddle Aeronautical University alumni
Living people
National War College alumni
Recipients of the Defense Superior Service Medal
Recipients of the Legion of Merit
United States Air Force Academy alumni
United States Air Force generals
United States Air Force personnel of the War in Afghanistan (2001–2021)